|}

The Cleeve Hurdle is a Grade 2 National Hunt hurdle race in Great Britain which is open to horses aged five years or older. It is run on the New Course at Cheltenham over a distance of about 3 miles (2 miles 7 furlongs and 213 yards, or 4,822 metres), and during its running there are twelve hurdles to be jumped. The race is scheduled to take place each year in January.

The race was first run in 1983 over a distance of 2 miles 5 furlongs and 110 yards.
In the late 1980s the event was classed at Listed level, and its full title was the Bishops Cleeve Hurdle. It was promoted to Grade 1 status in 1991, and in the following years its title was shortened to the present form.  It was downgraded to Grade 2 status in 2004, and its distance was extended to the present length in 2005. In its analysis of that year's running, the Racing Post commented that the modified Cleeve Hurdle was "effectively replacing the long-distance hurdle formerly run at Haydock on Peter Marsh day."

The race is now a leading trial for the Stayers' Hurdle at the Cheltenham Festival.

Winners

See also
 Horse racing in Great Britain
 List of British National Hunt races

References
 Racing Post:
, 
 
 pedigreequery.com – Cleeve Hurdle – Cheltenham.

External links
 Race Recordings 

National Hunt races in Great Britain
Cheltenham Racecourse
National Hunt hurdle races
Recurring sporting events established in 1983
1983 establishments in England